Caesariana or Cæsariana may refer to the following places in/since Roman Antiquity :

 Caesariana (Numidia), modern Kessaria in Algeria, former bishopric and present Latin titular see
 Caesariana (Pannonia), modern Baláca in Hungary, a military settlement